Oxytosis/ferroptosis is a type of programmed cell death dependent on iron and characterized by the accumulation of lipid peroxides, and is genetically and biochemically distinct from other forms of regulated cell death such as apoptosis. Oxytosis/ferroptosis is initiated by the failure of the glutathione-dependent antioxidant defenses, resulting in unchecked lipid peroxidation and eventual cell death. Lipophilic antioxidants and iron chelators can prevent ferroptotic cell death. Although the connection between iron and lipid peroxidation has been appreciated for years, it was not until 2012 that Brent Stockwell and Scott J. Dixon coined the term ferroptosis and described several of its key features, although Pamela Maher and David Schubert discovered the process in 2001 and called it oxytosis. While they did not describe the involvement of iron at the time, oxytosis and ferroptosis are today thought to be the same cell death mechanism.

Researchers have identified roles in which oxytosis/ferroptosis can contribute to the medical field, such as the development of cancer therapies. Ferroptosis activation plays a regulatory role on growth of tumor cells in the human body. However, the positive effects of oxytosis/ferroptosis could be potentially neutralized by its disruption of metabolic pathways and disruption of homeostasis in the human body. Since oxytosis/ferroptosis is a form of regulated cell death, some of the molecules that regulate oxytosis/ferroptosis are involved in metabolic pathways that regulate cysteine exploitation, glutathione state, nicotinamide adenine dinucleotide phosphate (NADP) function, lipid peroxidation, and iron homeostasis.

Mechanism 
The hallmark feature of oxytosis/ferroptosis is the iron-dependent accumulation of oxidatively damaged phospholipids (i.e., lipid peroxides). This change occurs when free radicals abstract electrons from a lipid molecule (typically affecting polyunsaturated fatty acids), thereby promoting their oxidation. The primary cellular mechanism of protection against oxytosis/ferroptosis is mediated by glutathione peroxidase 4 (GPX4), a glutathione-dependent hydroperoxidase that converts lipid peroxides into non-toxic lipid alcohols. Recently, a second parallel protective pathway was independently discovered by two labs that involves the oxidoreductase FSP1 (also known as AIFM2). Their findings indicate that FSP1 enzymatically reduces non-mitochondrial coenzyme Q10, thereby generating a potent lipophilic antioxidant that suppresses the propagation of lipid peroxides. A similar mechanism for a cofactor moonlighting as a diffusable antioxidant was discovered in the same year for tetrahydrobiopterin (BH4), a product of the rate-limiting enzyme GCH1.

Small molecules such as erastin, sulfasalazine, sorafenib, (1S, 3R)-RSL3, ML162, and ML210 are known inhibitors of tumor cell growth via induction of oxytosis/ferroptosis. These compounds do not trigger apoptosis and therefore do not cause chromatin margination or poly (ADP-ribose) polymerase (PARP) cleavage. Instead, oxytosis/ferroptosis causes changes in mitochondrial phenotype. Iron is also necessary for small-molecule oxytosis/ferroptosis induction; therefore, these compounds can be inhibited by iron chelators. Erastin acts through inhibition of the cystine/glutamate transporter, thus causing decreased intracellular glutathione (GSH) levels. Given that GSH is necessary for GPX4 function, depletion of this cofactor can lead to ferroptotic cell death. Oxytosis/ferroptosis can also be induced through inhibition of GPX4, as is the molecular mechanism of action of RSL3, ML162, and ML210. In some cells, FSP1 compensates for loss of GPX4 activity, and both GPX4 and FSP1 must be inhibited simultaneously to induce oxytosis/ferroptosis.

Live-cell imaging has been used to observe the morphological changes that cells undergo during oxytosis/ferroptosis. Initially the cell contracts and then begins to swell. Perinuclear lipid assembly is observed immediately before oxytosis/ferroptosis occurs. After the process is complete, lipid droplets are redistributed throughout the cell (see GIF on right side).

Comparison to apoptosis in the nervous system
Another form of cell death that occurs in the nervous system is apoptosis, which results in cell breakage into small, apoptotic bodies taken up through phagocytosis. This process occurs continuously within mammalian nervous system processes that begin at fetal development and continue through adult life. Apoptotic death is crucial for the correct population size of neuronal and glial cells. Similarly to oxytosis/ferroptosis, deficiencies in apoptotic processes can result in many health complications, including neurodegeneration.

Within the study of neuronal apoptosis, most research has been conducted on the neurons of the superior cervical ganglion. In order for these neurons to survive and innervate their target tissues, they must have nerve growth factor (NGF). Normally, NGF binds to a tyrosine kinase receptor, TrkA, which activates phosphatidylinositol 3-kinase-Akt (PI3K-Akt) and extracellular signal-regulated kinase (Raf-MEK-ERK) signaling pathways. This occurs during normal development which promotes neuronal growth in the sympathetic nervous system.

During embryonic development, the absence of NGF activates apoptosis by decreasing the activity of the signaling pathways normally activated by NGF. Without NGF, the neurons of the sympathetic nervous system begin to atrophy, glucose uptake rates fall, and the rates of protein synthesis and gene expression slow. Apoptotic death from NGF withdrawal also requires caspase activity. Upon NGF withdrawal, caspase-3 activation occurs through an in-vitro pathway beginning with the release of cytochrome c from the mitochondria. In a surviving sympathetic neuron, the overexpression of anti-apoptotic B-cell CLL/lymphoma 2 (Bcl-2) proteins prevents NGF withdrawal-induced death. However, overexpression of a separate, pro-apoptotic Bcl-2 gene, Bax, stimulates the release of cytochrome c2. Cytochrome c promotes the activation of caspase-9 through the formation of the apoptosome. Once caspase-9 is activated, it can cleave and activate caspase-3 resulting in cell death. Notably, apoptosis does not release intracellular fluid as neurons that are degraded though oxytosis/ferroptosis do. During oxytosis/ferroptosis, neurons release lipid metabolites from inside the cell body. This is a key difference between oxytosis/ferroptosis and apoptosis.

In neurons 

Neural connections are constantly changing within the nervous system. Synaptic connections that are used more often are kept intact and promoted, while synaptic connections that are rarely used are subject to degradation. Elevated levels of synaptic connection loss and degradation of neurons are linked to neurodegenerative diseases. More recently, oxytosis/ferroptosis has been linked to diverse brain diseases. Two new studies show that oxytosis/ferroptosis contributes to neuronal death after intracerebral hemorrhage. Neurons that are degraded through oxytosis/ferroptosis release lipid metabolites from inside the cell body. The lipid metabolites are harmful to surrounding neurons, causing inflammation in the brain. Inflammation is a pathological feature of Alzheimer’s disease and intracerebral hemorrhage.

In a study performed using mice, it was found that the absence of Gpx4 promoted oxytosis/ferroptosis. Foods high in vitamin E promote Gpx4 activity, consequently inhibiting oxytosis/ferroptosis and preventing inflammation in brain regions. In the experimental group of mice that were manipulated to have decreased Gpx4 levels, mice were observed to have cognitive impairment and neurodegeneration of hippocampal neurons, again linking oxytosis/ferroptosis to neurodegenerative diseases.

Similarly, presence of transcription factors, specifically ATF4, can influence how readily a neuron undergoes cell death. The presence of ATF4 promotes resistance in cells against oxytosis/ferroptosis. However, this resistance can cause other diseases, such as cancer, to progress and become malignant. While ATF4 provides resistance oxytosis/ferroptosis, an abundance of ATF4 causes neurodegeneration.

Recent studies have suggested that oxytosis/ferroptosis contributes to neuronal cell death after traumatic brain injury.

Potential role in cancer treatment 

Preliminary reports suggest that oxytosis/ferroptosis may be a means through which tumor cells can be killed. Oxytosis/ferroptosis has been implicated in several types of cancer, including:

 Breast
 Acute myeloid leukemia
 Pancreatic ductal adenocarcinoma
 Ovarian
 B-cell lymphoma
 Renal cell carcinomas
 Lung
 Glioblastoma

These forms of cancer have been hypothesized to be highly sensitive to oxytosis/ferroptosis induction. An upregulation of iron levels has also been seen to induce oxytosis/ferroptosis in certain types of cancer, such as breast cancer. Breast cancer cells have exhibited vulnerability to oxytosis/ferroptosis via a combination of siramesine and lapatinib. These cells also exhibited an autophagic cycle independent of ferroptotic activity, indicating that the two different forms of cell death could be controlled to activate at specific times following treatment.

Notably, not all cancers are necessarily sensitive to oxytosis/ferroptosis induction. For instance, one study has demonstrated that oxytosis/ferroptosis in polymorphonuclear myeloid-derived suppressor cells in the tumor microenvironment releases oxidized lipids that contribute to immune suppression.

See also

References

External links 
 KEGG pathway entry

Programmed cell death
Medical aspects of death
Cellular processes